Leaves Turn Inside You is the seventh and final studio album by the American post-hardcore band Unwound, released on April 17, 2001 by Kill Rock Stars. 

The album received critical acclaim from several music publications. Marking the return of original drummer and co-founder Brandt Sandeno who had switched to keyboards and guitar, it is the only studio album to feature all four members.

Recording and release 
Unlike previous Unwound albums, Leaves Turn Inside You was recorded in 2000 by the band members at their own built studio, MagRecOne ("Magnetic Recording One"), in Olympia, Washington. As singer and guitarist Justin Trosper explains, "Every record, we tried to raise the bar to some degree by asking, 'What can we do to make this better?' Usually that was just increasing the amount of time we spent in the studio. So the idea with the last record is that we would build a studio to record ourselves and break out of the pattern we'd established with [longtime producer] Steve Fisk and we'd have as much time to do it as we wanted — for better or worse". All songs were written and recorded by Unwound, with the production being handled between the three band members. 

Leaves Turn Inside You was released as a double LP and double CD on April 17, 2001 by the independent record label Kill Rock Stars, which also released the band's previous five studio albums. The CD version is enhanced with two music videos: "Radio Gra" (by Slater Bradley) and "Scarlette" (by animator Zak Margolis). A promotional CD version on Matador Europe exists, which features the whole album on one CD, omitting the videos; it comes in a slimline jewelcase with a different cover art and a quote citing Unwound as the best live band of their era.

Music and lyrics 
Leaves Turn Inside You continues down the exploratory path of Repetition and Challenge for a Civilized Society, using Mellotron and a more subdued instrumental attack. In fact, the discs are titled 2 and 3, implying that Challenge for a Civilized Society is the first one. The song "Below the Salt" features delicate piano, heavy usage of reverb, and intimate, near-whispered vocals, while "Scarlette" brings back the band's hardcore punk origins. "Terminus" features cryptic lyrics and apocalyptic chamber orchestration. Drummer Sara Lund and Janet Weiss of sonic/geographic contemporaries Sleater-Kinney provide backing vocals on "Demons Sing Love Songs".

Leaves, according to Trebles Jeff Terich, exchanges Unwound's former "noisy [and] pulsing" punk for "nuanced" art punk and shoegaze songcraft. He would go on to hail it "an avant-garde masterpiece". Sputnikmusic saw the group devote to "mellow" and "lyrically anxious" indie rock for its majority. They also summarized it as a "melancholic" fusion of dream pop, noise rock, and post-rock.

Critical reception 

Leaves Turn Inside You received high acclaim from several music critics. AllMusic reviewer Bryan Carroll described the album as "a unique, epic effort from one of the most inventive and dynamic rock bands in recent memory". Max Finneran, writing for Spin, commented: "Rounding off the edges of its tried and true punk-rock grind with the melodic and rhythmic tropes of '60s psychedelia, Unwound has perfectly re-imagined a sound that most art-students wouldn't even spit on the first time around". PopMatters critic Matt Cibula stated that Unwound "plays with a tightness and richness that few bands can touch anymore; they have turned into the metal Minutemen". Camilo Arturo Leslie of Pitchfork wrote that he was "convinced that, if you've been following this band's development, the initial bewildered expression on your face will give way to total enchantment".

In The Wire, Tom Ridge called the album a "radical departure in its scope and overall sound" from Unwound's previous works. According to Ridge, "the hardcore scene has spat out such individual classics at infrequent intervals, and Leaves sits comfortably alongside Hüsker Dü's Zen Arcade, The Minutemen's Double Nickels on the Dime and Sonic Youth's Daydream Nation."

Legacy and impact 
In a 2014 Quietus article, Angus Andrew of experimental rock group Liars revealed Leaves to be one of his favorite records, calling it an "overwhelmingly complete and brave" entry in Unwound's "near flawless" discography. Noting their move towards an "exciting, challenging and experimental" sound, he dubbed the album a "giant stylistic leap of faith" that his band "took a large dose of influence" from.

Track listing 
All music composed by Unwound.

Personnel 
Credits adapted from liner notes for Leaves Turn Inside You.

Unwound
Justin Trosper – guitar, vocals, background vocals (on "Summer Freeze"), Mellotron (on "Who Cares"), Rhodes piano (on "Terminus"), piano (on "Below the Salt"), synthesizer (on "Treachery" and "Radio Gra"), engineering, production, tape operation
Sara Lund – drums, percussion, background vocals (on "Demons Sing Love Songs"), engineering, production, tape operation
Vern Rumsey – bass, guitar (on "We Invent You" and "Terminus"), organ (on "Off This Century"), piano (on "October All Over" and "Who Cares"), vocals (on "December"), engineering, production, tape operation
Brandt Sandeno – background vocals (on "Look a Ghost" and "Summer Freeze"), harpsichord (on "Demons Sing Love Songs"), Mellotron (on "We Invent You", "Demons Sing Love Songs", "October All Over", "Radio Gra" and "Below the Salt"), organ (on "We Invent You"), Rhodes piano (on "Terminus" and "One Lick Less"), slide guitar (on "Off This Century"), vibraphone (on "Who Cares"), engineering, tape operation

Additional musicians
 Murray W. – Optiphone (on "One Lick Less"), Dynachord (on "Summer Freeze")
 Steve Fisk – Mellotron (on "Scarlette"), jazz performance (on "Who Cares")
 Derek Johnson – cello (on "Terminus")
 Janet Weiss – background vocals (on "Demons Sing Love Songs")
Technical personnel
 Kip Beelman – engineering, tape operation
 Pat Castaldo – layout
 Phil Ek – engineering, tape operation
 Roger Seibel – mastering
 Stefano Giovannini – photography

References

External links 

2001 albums
Albums produced by Phil Ek
Kill Rock Stars albums
Unwound albums